Lugansk Airlines was an airline based in Luhansk, Ukraine. It operated services within Ukraine as well as the wet leasing of its aircraft. Its main base was Luhansk International Airport.

History
In 1992, Air Ukraine was formed by the resources of various Ukrainian Aeroflot divisions, the Luhansk division being one of them. After Air Ukraine's bankruptcy, Lugansk Airlines became an independent company. In 2010, Lugansk Airlines ceased all operations due to bankruptcy.

Fleet

External links
Luhansk Airlines

References

Defunct airlines of Ukraine
Luhansk